Notodromadidae is a family of crustaceans belonging to the order Podocopida.

Genera:
 Cyprois Zenker, 1854
 Gurayacypris Battish, 1987
 Indiacypris Hartmann, 1964
 Kennethia De Deckker, 1979
 Neozonocypris Klie, 1944
 Newnhamia King, 1855
 Notodromas Lilljeborg, 1853

References

Podocopida